Andrey Viktorovich Smirnov (born 28 August 1973) is a Russian wheelchair curler playing as skip for the Russian wheelchair curling team. He and his team won the silver medal at the 2014 Paralympic Games and gold medals at the 2012 and 2015 World Championships.

Biography
As a child Smirnov did speed skating, but after an accident at the age of 12, when he fell into an elevator pit on a building site, he performed sports including arm wrestling, darts, tennis and basketball.

Besides his success in international tournaments Smirnov won bronze at the 2011-12 Russian National Championships. He is a member of the local sports club "Rodnik" in Yekaterinburg.

Awards 
 Medal of the Order "For Merit to the Fatherland" I class (17 March 2014) – for the huge contribution to the development of physical culture and sports, and for the high athletic performances at the 2014 Paralympic Winter Games in Sochi
 Merited Master of Sports of Russia

References

External links 

 Profile at the International Paralympic Committee's website

1973 births
Living people
Russian male curlers
Sportspeople from Yekaterinburg
Russian wheelchair curlers
Paralympic silver medalists for Russia
Wheelchair curlers at the 2014 Winter Paralympics
World wheelchair curling champions
Recipients of the Medal of the Order "For Merit to the Fatherland" I class
Paralympic medalists in wheelchair curling
Medalists at the 2014 Winter Paralympics
Paralympic wheelchair curlers of Russia
21st-century Russian people